The Arab, Arabic, or Arabian mile (al-mīl) was a historical Arabic unit of length. Its precise length is disputed, lying between 1.8 and 2.0 km. It was used by medieval Arab geographers and astronomers. The predecessor of the modern nautical mile, it extended the Roman mile to fit an astronomical approximation of 1 minute of an arc of latitude measured along a north–south meridian. The distance between two pillars whose latitudes differed by 1 degree in a north–south direction was measured using sighting pegs along a flat desert plane.

There were 4000 cubits in an Arabic mile. If al-Farghani used the legal cubit as his unit of measurement, then an Arabic mile was 1995 meters long. If he used al-Ma'mun's surveying cubit, it was 1925 meters long or 1.04 modern nautical miles.

Al-Ma'mun's arc measurement

Around 830 AD, Caliph Al-Ma'mun commissioned a group of Muslim astronomers and Muslim geographers to perform an arc measurement from Tadmur (Palmyra) to Raqqa, in modern Syria. They found the cities to be separated by one degree of latitude and the corresponding meridian arc distance to be 66⅔ miles and thus calculated the Earth's circumference to be 24,000 miles.

Another estimate given by his astronomers was 56⅔ Arabic miles (111.8 km per degree), which corresponds to a circumference of 40,248 km, very close to the current values of 111.3 km per degree and 40,068 km circumference, respectively.

See also
 Ancient Arabic units of measurement
 mile
 Biblical mile

Notes

Bibliography

Paul Lunde. “Al-Faraghani and the Short Degree.” The Middle East and the Age of Discovery Aramco World Magazine Exhibition Issue, 43:3. pp. 15–17.

Obsolete units of measurement
Geography in the medieval Islamic world
Units of length